Pancratium sickenbergeri is a species of flowering plant in the Amaryllidaceae family. It is a Saharo-Arabian plant that grows in deserts, such as the Negev. It is native to Israel, Egypt, Lebanon, Palestine, Saudi Arabia, and Syria. The flowers look like the Mediterranean species Pancratium maritimum, but the leaves of P. sickenbergeri are curly and the plant is much smaller. Unusually for the desert, the seeds are distributed by floodwaters when they occur in the winter.

References

sickenbergeri
Plants described in 1882
Flora of Egypt
Flora of Lebanon
Flora of Palestine (region)
Flora of Saudi Arabia
Flora of Syria
Taxa named by Paul Friedrich August Ascherson
Taxa named by Georg August Schweinfurth